Iisalmi is a town and municipality in the region of Northern Savonia in Finland. The municipality is unilingually Finnish.

In the 2010s, Iisalmi is known as an export industry town, as well as a significant study town in the region.

History 
Iisalmi traces its roots back to 1627, when the parish of Iisalmi was formed around the local church. The town's old wooden church, Gustav Adolf Church, was consecrated in 1780.

In the 18th century, when Finland was under Swedish control, Sweden was frequently at war with Imperial Russia, and the area of Koljonvirta in Iisalmi was a battlefield on which one of the greatest Swedish victories occurred. However, Sweden lost its last war with Russia and had to surrender Finland to the Russian Empire in 1809.

Iisalmi gained its status as town on October 20, 1891.

Geography 
There are 111 lakes in the Iisalmi region, the largest of which are Lake Onkivesi, Lake Haapajärvi, Lake Porovesi and Lake Nerkoo.

Economy 

Olvi, the last big independent beer brewery in Finland, has its factory and headquarters in Iisalmi. (Other big Finnish breweries have been bought by multinational companies.)

Genelec, a manufacturer of active monitors and loudspeakers] used in recording studios worldwide, has its factory and headquarters in Iisalmi.

Normet, engineers and manufacturers of mechanised equipment for underground rock-mining and tunnelling, also has its factory and headquarters in Iisalmi. Headquarters is located in Espoo.

Profile Vehicles makes ambulances and police cars.

Iisalmi has its own railway station on the VR network. The line between Iisalmi and Oulu was electrified in December 2006, replacing diesel haulage of trains.

Culture

Events 
Iisalmi, even though being a relatively small town, has many cultural events on small and somewhat larger scales. One memorable event, of the many, is "Rompepäivät", which translates as "the days of old junk and stuff". People gather together bringing various old items, from small sewing needles to old tractors, for everyone to see and many small things to be sold. A few old restored cars, trucks, motorcycles and tractors, some of them Finnish-made, are displayed for others to see. Here people talk about "good old times" or wonder over "ancient artifacts". Sometimes some of the finely restored machines are for sale to anyone interested to buy—of course if they can afford it.

"Oluset" is a music festival organized each July annually. The main sponsor is local brewery company Olvi. "Oluset" roughly translates to "a few beers". Also a smaller festival, "Limuset" (Little soft drink festival" is organize as well by Olvi. "Limuset" is mainly dedicated to kids and young people, and no alcoholic drinks are sold in the area.

Food 

In the 1980s, each of Savonia's municipalities voted for its own parish dishes. Muurinpohjalettu, a thin pancake or crêpe made of wheat and barley, were chosen as the traditional food of Iisalmi.

According to the Guinness Book of Records, the world's smallest restaurant, Kuappi, is located in Iisalmi.

Music 
Currently the most famous Iisalmi-based band is a humorous country-rock orchestra Halavatun Papat. A rough translation of the name is "Damn Grandfathers".

20th-century composer Joonas Kokkonen was born here, as were singer-songwriter Jaakko Teppo and jazz pianist and composer Jarmo Savolainen.

Sports 
Iisalmi is best known for its football club, PK-37 and ice hockey club, IPK (Iisalmen Peli-Karhut). Other known sports clubs are FBI (floorball club), Iisalmen palloveikot, Klubi-36, Iina, Iisalmen Visa and Koljonvirran ratsastajat (riding club).

Iisalmi has many good locations for playing sports. There is a very nice frisbee golf place near the Paloisvuori ski center. There are also many good beaches in Iisalmi, for example Perttu's beach and the Beach of the City. Many beaches offer an opportunity for beach volleyball too. In winter time Iisalmi offers good ski trails and skating rinks; winter sports fans can also go downhill skiing and snowboarding at the Paloisvuori ski center. In addition, Iisalmi has good facilities for gym workouts, swimming, bowling and minigolf.

International relations

Twin towns — Sister cities
Iisalmi is twinned with:

  Notodden, Norway
  Pécel, Hungary
  Nyköping, Sweden  
  Lüneburg, Germany
  Nykøbing Falster, Denmark  
  Kirishi, Russia
  Võru, Estonia

See also
 Finnish national road 5
 Holy Cross Church, Iisalmi
 Iisalmi Airfield

References

External links

Official website of Iisalmi

 
1627 establishments in Sweden
Cities and towns in Finland
Grand Duchy of Finland
Populated places established in 1627